Myles Miller is a reporter at WNBC-TV, he was previously deputy press secretary for the FDNY.

From 2017-2019 he was an Emmy-award winning investigative reporter at NY1. He was the law enforcement reporter for WPIX and was a multimedia journalist at The New York Times. He was the youngest White House reporter in history having served in that role for News Corporation's iPad newspaper, The Daily.

Journalism

Miller began his reporting career at The New York Daily News.

He spent several years reporting for Fox Television Stations  in New Jersey and Washington, D.C.

He covered the northeastern United States for Reuters, traveled with President Barack Obama, the death of Osama bin Laden, the Supreme Court decision on the Affordable Care Act and the 2012 presidential election, as White House reporter  for News Corporation's The Daily; and launched Chasing New Jersey.

Miller is a two time Emmy Award winner.

References

External links

Living people
American newspaper journalists
People from the Bronx
Journalists from New York City
Year of birth missing (living people)